The Green Loop is a proposed urban design concept for a 6-mile-long linear park in Portland, Oregon, United States.

See also

, a proposed ring around Louisville, Kentucky

References

Linear parks
Parks in Portland, Oregon
Proposed parks in the United States